Trent Ashley Leverington (born 13 May 1980 in Brisbane, Queensland) is an Australian Motorcycle speedway rider, who rode with the Glasgow Tigers in the British Premier League. 

Leverington had spent all of his time in the UK with Glasgow but became a victim of the points limit in 2004 and was loaned out to the Stoke Potters. He returned in 2005 but lost his place to Leon Madsen. However, Madsen was later dropped and the promotion turned to Leverington to replace him.

References 

1980 births
Living people
Australian speedway riders
Motorcycle racers from Brisbane
Glasgow Tigers riders
Stoke Potters riders